Predrag Jovanović (born 11 August 1965) is a Serbian former footballer who played as a forward.

Career
In 1989, Jovanović moved from Maribor to Yugoslav First League side Sloboda Tuzla. He spent two seasons with the club (1989–90 and 1990–91), before signing with European Cup winners Red Star Belgrade.

References

External links
 
 

1965 births
Living people
Footballers from Belgrade
Yugoslav footballers
Serbia and Montenegro footballers
Serbian footballers
Association football forwards
NK Maribor players
FK Sloboda Tuzla players
Red Star Belgrade footballers
FK Proleter Zrenjanin players
Stuttgarter Kickers players
SC Kriens players
Chamois Niortais F.C. players
R. Charleroi S.C. players
R. Olympic Charleroi Châtelet Farciennes players
FK Pirmasens players
Yugoslav First League players
2. Bundesliga players
Swiss Super League players
Ligue 2 players
Belgian Pro League players
Serbia and Montenegro expatriate footballers
Expatriate footballers in Germany
Expatriate footballers in Switzerland
Expatriate footballers in France
Expatriate footballers in Belgium
Serbia and Montenegro expatriate sportspeople in Germany
Serbia and Montenegro expatriate sportspeople in Switzerland
Serbia and Montenegro expatriate sportspeople in France
Serbia and Montenegro expatriate sportspeople in Belgium